Gëran may refer to:
Gogaran, Armenia
Goran, Azerbaijan